Valeriy Oleksandrovych Chaly; Valeri Aleksandrovich Chaly (born 13 March 1958) is a Ukrainian and Russian football manager and a former player. He also holds Russian citizenship. He was the manager of FC Rubin Kazan.

References

1958 births
Sportspeople from Sevastopol
Living people
Soviet footballers
FC Dynamo Kirov players
SC Tavriya Simferopol players
FC Chayka Sevastopol players
SKA Odesa players
Ukrainian football managers
Ukrainian expatriate football managers
Expatriate football managers in Moldova
FC Rubin Kazan managers
Russian Premier League managers
Naturalised citizens of Russia
Russian football managers
Association football defenders